Santiago de la Barca is one of 28 parishes (administrative divisions) in Salas, a municipality within the province and autonomous community of Asturias, in northern Spain.

Villages
El Rubial 
Requejo (Requeixu)
Santiago de la Barca (Santiagu)

References  

Parishes in Salas